The 2011 Indianapolis City–County Council elections took place on November 8, 2011. All 29 seats were up for re-election, 25 districts and 4 at-large seats, on the Indianapolis City–County Council. Prior to the elections Republicans held a 15–13–1 seat majority. Following the elections Democrats gained control of the council with a 16–13 majority. This marked the first time in Indianapolis history that a Republican mayor would lead with a Democratic council.

The Indianapolis mayoral election took place alongside the council elections.

Results by district

References

Indianapolis 
Elections 2011
Indianapolis 2011
Indianapolis City-County Council